The men's 3000 metres steeplechase at the 2004 Summer Olympics as part of the athletics program were held at the Athens Olympic Stadium from August 21 to 24. The athletes competed in a three-heat qualifying round in which the top three from each heat, together with the six fastest losing runners, were given a place in the final race.

The Kenyan dominance in this event had become well notable. In the final, the Kenyan trio of Brimin Kipruto, Paul Kipsiele Koech, and 2003 World silver medalist Ezekiel Kemboi had established themselves into the lead, supporting each other throughout the race, and running the pace with their own strategy and tactics that could not be matched by any other athlete. On the other hand, Qatar's (Kenyan born) Musa Amer Obaid trailed the Kenyans to keep in contact and follow their every move. At the bell, the Kenyans were able to stay at the front. Spaniard Luis Miguel Martín joined them and tried to launch his sprint to chase the leaders, but he quickly fell behind as the race began to accelerate. Koech took the lead for the Kenyans and opened up a gap through the water jump, before Kemboi moved decisively to pass him and came down the home straight smoothly to victory. Kemboi turned to wave on his teammates Kipruto and Koech, as they cleared the final barrier and sprinted away jubilantly to give the Kenyans a sweep of the medal podium for the first time since the 1992 Barcelona Olympics.

Records
, the existing World and Olympic records were as follows.

No new records were set during the competition.

Qualification
The qualification period for athletics was 1 January 2003 to 9 August 2004. For the men's 3000 metres steeplechase, each National Olympic Committee was permitted to enter up to three athletes that had run the race in 8:24.60 or faster during the qualification period. If an NOC had no athletes that qualified under that standard, one athlete that had run the race in 8:32.00 or faster could be entered.

Schedule
All times are Greece Standard Time (UTC+2)

Results

Round 1
Qualification rule: The first three finishers in each heat (Q) plus the next six fastest overall runners (q) advanced to the final.

Heat 1

Heat 2

Heat 3

Final

References

External links
 IAAF Athens 2004 Olympic Coverage

M
Steeplechase at the Olympics
Men's events at the 2004 Summer Olympics